Initiative 13 was a 1978 initiative in Seattle, Washington, United States. One of its effects would have been to repeal city ordinances which protected housing rights and employment for gay and lesbian people. Another would have been to close the city Office of Women's Rights.

Seattle Pride in 1978 included protests against the initiative. Multiple organizations also protested the initiative.

Walt Crowley was one of the protest campaign organizers. On November 7, 1978, voters rejected the initiative by a 2–1 margin.

References

External links
Initiative 13 Media Packet
Seattle Committee Against Thirteen (SCAT) records, 1978
MOHAI exhibit

1970s in Seattle
1978 ballot measures
1978 in LGBT history
Initiatives in the United States